Berea is an inner city neighbourhood of Johannesburg, in the South African province of Gauteng. It is east and adjacent to the Johannesburg CBD. It is located in Region F of the City of Johannesburg Metropolitan Municipality.

It is located in between Yeoville and Hillbrow to the east and west respectively. It is notorious for high levels of crime and population density. Barnato Park High School is located in the neighbourhood

History
The suburb is situated on part of an old Witwatersrand farm called Doornfontein. It was established in 1893 and is named after Berea, Durban.

Redevelopment
A small central section of Berea is Johannesburg's first residential city improvement district (CID). Since mid-2006 crime in Berea has dropped between 70 and 80 percent. The 2198 Boys from Berea (Prince Mnaphi known as Pringle Maarbiter and Fortune Mkhwebu known as Fox alongside Warren Mnguni known as Picasso) are Berea representatives with their street wear clothing brand known as Extraordinary.

References

Johannesburg Region F